Fencing at the 2002 West Asian Games was held at the Yarmouk Hall, Kuwait City, Kuwait. It had a men's only programm in all three fencing weapons.

Medalists

Medal table

References

Official website

External links
Olympic Council of Asia - 2002 West Asian Games

West Asian Games
2002 West Asian Games
2002